The 1955 season was Dinamo București's seventh season in Divizia A. Dinamo bring the first Romanian title home, winning the championship by three points. During the season, Dinamo played 24 matches, winning 15, drawing 7 and losing only 2.

Results

Squad 

Goalkeepers: Petre Curcan (4 / 0), Florea Birtașu (18 / 0 ), Nicolae Panaghia (3 / 0).
Defenders:  Gheorghe Băcuț (24 / 0), Ladislau Băcuț (24 / 0), Iosif Szökő (18 / 1).
Midfielders: Valeriu Călinoiu (22 / 1), Gheorghe Toma (24 / 0), Alexandru Nemeş (4 / 0), Florian Anghel (6 / 0).
Forwards: Carol Bartha (11 / 4); Onoriu Boian (8 / 1); Nicolae Dumitru (21 / 2); Alexandru Ene (23 / 14); Valeriu Neagu (23 / 10); Ion Suru (22 / 7); Nicolae Magheţ (11 / 2); Mihai Raica (1 / 0); Gheorghe Niţulescu (1 / 0).
(league appearances and goals listed in brackets)

Manager: Angelo Niculescu.

Transfers 

Titus Ozon leaves Dinamo after five years in the red and white shirt, bound for Progresul București, newly promoted team. The main transfer made by Dinamo is the goalkeeper Petru Curcan from Stiinta Timişoara.

References 

 www.labtof.ro
 www.romaniansoccer.ro

1955
Association football clubs 1955 season
1955–56 in Romanian football
1954–55 in Romanian football
1955